MORTAR is a nonprofit organization founded in Cincinnati in 2014. The goal of the organization is to provide resources for entrepreneurs to grow their businesses.

Founding
MORTAR was founded in 2014, with its first location in the Cincinnati neighborhood of Over-the-Rhine (OTR), which has the highest income inequality of more than 61,000 communities in the US. It was co-founded by Allen Woods, William Thomas, and Derrick Braziel, all of whom are African-American. While Over-the-Rhine was gaining economic vitality, the three co-founders noted that many poor and black residents of OTR were being "left behind". Thomas said, "We saw a lot of white-owned businesses pop up and saw a lot of residents who looked like us without the opportunities." The name "MORTAR" refers to the founders' prioritization of neighborhood development, saying that there is too much emphasis on the "bricks" that create the buildings but that "people are the mortar that holds communities together". By 2018, it had expanded to additional Cincinnati neighborhoods, including Walnut Hills, West End, and Uptown. It also opened a second physical location in Over-the-Rhine in 2018.

Services
MORTAR offers training programs for entrepreneurs. The training program is fourteen-weeks long, with each cohort consisting of 12–15 people. They run six training programs each year as of 2018. Graduates of the training program become part of MORTAR's alumni program to foster networking and mentorship among participants. Many participants are considered economically disadvantaged, including those who have experienced homelessness or incarceration. A majority are low-income women. MORTAR additionally provides entrepreneurs assistance with securing store fronts, legal services, and guidance for marketing. Its aim is to allow local residents to participate and benefit from neighborhood revitalization efforts.

Achievements and outcomes
As of September 2018, 175 individuals had graduated from MORTAR's entrepreneur training program. It has a 95% graduation rate. As of 2016, the program had a long waiting list, but only 7% of its participants were from OTR. For their involvement with MORTAR, cofounders Derrick Braziel and William Thomas were included on the Forbes 30 Under 30 in 2016. In 2016, MORTAR was covered on NBC Nightly News. In 2016 and 2017, it was one of twenty winners of the Small Business Administration's Growth Accelerator Fund competition.

MORTAR is funded and supported by several partners, including University of Cincinnati, Procter & Gamble (headquartered in Cincinnati), and the Cincinnati Center City Development Corporation (3CDC). It raised $500,000 for its programs in 2017, and hoped to raise $700,000 in 2018.

References

Organizations based in Cincinnati
Non-profit organizations based in Ohio
Startup accelerators
Social enterprises